is a Japanese weather satellite, the 8th of the Himawari geostationary weather satellites operated by the Japan Meteorological Agency. The spacecraft was constructed by Mitsubishi Electric with assistance from Boeing, and is the first of two similar satellites to be based on the DS2000 satellite bus. Himawari 8 entered operational service on 7 July 2015 and is the successor to MTSAT-2 (Himawari 7) which was launched in 2006.

Launch
Himawari 8 was launched atop a H-IIA rocket flying from the Yoshinobu Launch Complex Pad 1 at the Tanegashima Space Center. The launch occurred at 05:16 UTC on 7 October 2014 and reached its operational geostationary orbit in October 2014, at 35,786 kilometers and 140.7 degrees East.

Himawari 9, which is identical to Himawari 8, was launched on 2 November 2016 and placed in a stand-by orbit until 05:00 UTC by 13 December 2022, when it succeeded Himawari 8.

Purpose 
The role of Himawari 8 is to provide typhoon, rainstorm, weather forecast and other related reports for Japan, East Asia, and Western Pacific region. It is also responsible for ensuring the safety of ships, aviation and observing the environment of the earth.

Its temporal and spatial resolution enables it to observe disastrous events in remote places, such as volcanic eruptions. The Himawari satellite was able to capture the Tianjin explosions in 2015, and the Hunga Tonga–Hunga Ha'apai eruption in 2022.

Data recorded from the Japanese Himawari 8 will be made freely available for use by meteorological agencies in other countries.

Design
The DS2000 satellite bus has a lifespan of 15 years, however the expected operational lifespan of Himawari 8 is expected to be limited by its instruments which are only designed for 8 years of service. Power is supplied by a single gallium arsenide solar panel, which provides up to 2.6 kilowatts of power.

Instruments
The primary instrument aboard Himawari 8, the Advanced Himawari Imager (AHI), is a 16 channel multispectral imager to capture visible light and infrared images of the Asia-Pacific region. The instrument was designed and built by Exelis Geospatial Systems (now Harris Space & Intelligence Systems) and has similar spectral and spatial characteristics to the Advanced Baseline Imager (ABI) used in the American GOES-16, -17, -T, and -U satellites. The AHI can produce images with a resolution down to 500m and can provide full disk observations every 10 mins and images of Japan every 2.5 minutes. The Australian Bureau of Meteorology CEO Dr Rob Vertessy stated that Himawari 8 "generates about 50 times more data than the previous satellite". A recent study reported that Himawari-8 had acquired cloud-free observations every 4 days, while capturing the seasonal changes of vegetation in the cloud-prone region of Southeast Asia more accurately than before.

The Space Environmental Data Acquisition Monitor (SEDA) is the second instrument aboard Himawari 8, and it consists of two sensors: SEDA-e for detecting high energy electrons and SEDA-p for detecting high energy protons. SEDA-e is a single element with 8 stacked charge collecting plates. It has an energy range of 0.2-4.5 MeV and a field of view of ±78.3°. SEDA-p consists of 8 separate proton telescope elements. In total, SEDA-e has an energy range of 15-100 MeV and a field of view of ±39.35°. Both sensors have a time resolution of 10 seconds. The data from this instrument is transmitted to a ground station in Saitama, Japan with a Ka-band signal and is ultimately provided to the National Institute of Information and Communications Technology (NICT) for use monitoring space weather events along the Japanese meridian.

Gallery

References

External links

 
 Meteorological Satellites of JMA
 JMA Satellite Imagery, providing infrared, vapor and true-color Himawari 8 imageries every 30 minutes
 Himawari-8 Real-time Web from NICT, providing full-disc pictures of true color and all 16 bands every 10 minutes 
 RealEarth including imageries from all 16 bands of Himawari 8
 Himawari-8 - Third-Generation Weather Satellite from Digital Typhoon
 Himawari 8 3D model from Asahi Shinbun
 Glittering Blue Time lapsed imagery from Himawari 8
 . An animation made from visible and infrared images taken by Himawari 8 from December 21, 2015, to December 21, 2016.

2014 in Japan
Earth imaging satellites
Himawari satellite series
Satellites using the DS2000 bus
Spacecraft launched in 2014